Slovakia competed at the 2011 World Championships in Athletics from 27 August to 4 September in Daegu, South Korea.
A team of 8 athletes was
announced to represent the country
in the event. The team is led by walker Matej Tóth competing in both 20 km
and 50 km race walking events, and European Athletics Indoor Championships triple jump bronze medalist Dana Veldaková.

Results

Men

Women

References

External links
Official local organising committee website
Official IAAF competition website

Nations at the 2011 World Championships in Athletics
World Championships in Athletics
Slovakia at the World Championships in Athletics